Grand Traverse College, latter known as Benzonia College, was a private college at Benzonia, Michigan during the 19th century.

The college was patterned after the model of Olivet College and Oberlin College.  It opened in 1858 and offered primarily college preparatory and teacher training curriculum.  In 1891 it changed its name to Benzonia College. It stopped offering college courses in 1900 but continued as Benzonia Academy to offer college preparatory courses until 1918.

One of Grand Traverse's most eminent alumni was historian Bruce Catton.

References

Sources
Text of Historical Marker

Defunct private universities and colleges in Michigan
Educational institutions established in 1858
1858 establishments in Michigan
Educational institutions disestablished in 1918
1918 disestablishments in Michigan
Education in Benzie County, Michigan